Nanzhang County is a county of northwestern Hubei province, People's Republic of China. It is under the administration of Xiangyang City.

Administrative divisions
Ten towns:
Chengguan, Wu'an, Jiuji, Limiao, Changping, Xueping, Banqiao, Xunjian, Donggong, and Xiaoyan

One other area:
Qinghe

Climate

References 

 
Counties of Hubei
Xiangyang